Rattlesnake: The Ahanna Story also known as The Armadas is a 2020 Nigerian thriller action film executive produced by Charles Okpaleke and directed by Ramsey Nouah. It is the official remake of the 1995 Nigerian classic action thriller film Rattlesnake which was directed by Amaka Igwe. The film stars Stan Nze, Chiwetalu Agu, Osas Ighodaro, Omotola Jalade Ekeinde and Ayo Makun in the lead roles. It had its theatrical release on 13 November 2020. It received mixed reviews from critics and ranked 24th overall on the list of highest-grossing Nigerian films of all time at the end of its theatrical run. It is regarded as one of the best Nigerian films of 2020.

Synopsis 
Ahanna (Stan Nze), an unemployed graduate, is frustrated with his current situation, and travels to Lagos in search of his mother Nancy (Chiyere Wilfred) who left their village with his siblings and his uncle Odinaka (Chiwetalu Agu) after his father Louis's (Sunny McDon) funeral. Upon arriving in Lagos Ahanna is robbed, but after collaborating with a book trader for some cash he locates his mother's Lekki residence. Ahanna is disgusted to discover that Nancy, now living in luxury, is now married to his uncle, and his siblings currently reside in with a relative in America. He storms out of the house and pays a visit to his old friends, Nze and his sister Amara (Osas Ighodaro). Nze confides in Ahanna about his colossal debt to drug kingpin Ali Mahmood (Norbert Young) who has threatened to kill him in two days unless the money is repaid. Ahanna suggests they rob Odinaka, and he and Nze both break into the property at night. Ahanna's mother recognises her masked son when an envelope bearing his name drops to the floor, and he demands to know how Odinaka had killed Louis whose death he had always considered suspicious. Odinaka then drops a bombshell - not only were he and Nancy having a secret affair when Ahanna's father was still alive, but he was the biological father of Ahanna's brother Naza.

Ahanna and Nze assemble a group of men called "The Armadas" with several different skills, carrying out a series of spectacular heists. But things take a swift u-turn and the gang suddenly find themselves with better enemies on both sides.

Cast 
 Stan Nze as Ahanna Okolo
 Osas Ighodaro as Amara
 Bucci Franklin as Nzenozo
 Chiwetalu Agu as Odinaka
 Omotola Jalade Ekeinde as Maimuna Atafo
 Ayo Makun as Timi Phillips
Emeka Nwagbaraocha as Sango
 Efa Iwara as Bala
 Tobi Bakre as Ike
 Brutus Richards as Smoke
 Odera Adimorah as Egbe
 Elma Mbadiwe as Adaugo
 Rebecca Nengi Hampson as Boma George
 Norbert Young as Ali Mahmood
 Sonny McDon as Louis
 Gloria Young as Madam Ngozi Maduako
 Ejike Asiegbu as politician
 Chinyere Wilfred as Nancy

Production 
The film project was the second directorial venture for director Ramsey Nouah after Living in Bondage: Breaking Free (2019). This also marked the second collaboration between director Ramsey Nouah and producer Charles Okpaleke after 2019 Nigerian drama film Living in Bondage: Breaking Free. The film was made following the box office success of Living in Bondage: Breaking Free and the film was announced as modern day remake of 1995 classic film Rattlesnake. The announcement regarding the film remake was revealed by the producer in March 2020. It was initially speculated to be the sequel of Rattlesnake but the film producer refused the speculations stating that it is the remake of the yesteryear film in modern day.

Sonny McDon was the only cast member of the 1995 film who was retained to play the supporting role in the remake. Stan Nze was played the titular role as Ahanna, the lead character which was initially played by Francis Duru in Rattlesnake. Second runner-up of the Big Brother Naija Lockdown Nengi Rebecca Hampson also played a supporting role in the film and was her film acting debut.

The first look poster of the film was unveiled by the Play Network Studios on 1 September 2020 via Instagram. Most of the portions of the film were predominantly shot in Lagos, Abuja and Cape Town, South Africa. The film was shot within a duration of just four weeks amid the COVID-19 pandemic in Nigeria.

Soundtrack 
The music for the film is scored by Larry Gaaga. A total of eight tracks were composed for the album featuring A-list Afrobeats artistes. The soundtrack album opened to extremely positive reception.

Release and box office 
The film was premiered at the FilmHouse Cinemas in Lagos on 11 November 2020 prior to the theatrical release. It was theatrically released on 13 November 2020 coinciding with the nationwide End SARS protests in Nigeria against the SARS police band. The film made over ₦13 million (₦13,567,700) in the opening week since its theatrical release. The final cumulative stood at ₦70,381,550 at the box office.

In a review by Culture Custodian, Franklin Ugobude said "The curse of every remake is the inevitable comparison to the original and whether it stacks up to it or not, and The Ahanna Story simply cannot lace the boots of Amaka Igwe's Rattlesnake." Another reviewer rated the movie 6.2/10 saying "Rattlesnake: The Ahanna Story is entertaining and exhausting all at once... but at the same time, it leaves you tingling with pride at the fact that filmmaking in Nollywood has grown in leaps."

Awards and nominations

References

External links 

 

2020 films
Nigerian action thriller films
English-language Nigerian films
2020s coming-of-age films
2020 action thriller films
Films shot in Abuja
Films shot in Lagos
Nigerian coming-of-age films
Africa Magic Viewers' Choice Awards winners
AMVCA Best Overall Film winners
2020s English-language films